New York State Route 17 (NY 17) is a major state highway that extends for  through the Southern Tier and Downstate regions of New York in the United States. It begins at the Pennsylvania state line in Mina and follows the Southern Tier Expressway east through Corning to Binghamton and the Quickway from Binghamton east to Woodbury, where it turns south to follow the Orange Turnpike to the New Jersey state line near Suffern, where it connects to  New Jersey Route 17. From the Pennsylvania border to the village of Waverly and from Binghamton to Windsor, NY 17 is concurrent with Interstate 86 (I-86). Eventually, the entire east–west portion of NY 17 from the Pennsylvania border to Woodbury will become I-86 as projects to upgrade the route to Interstate Highway standards are completed.

At , NY 17 is the longest state route in New York, and is the second-longest highway of any kind in the state, beside the Thruway. It serves 11 counties (Chautauqua, Cattaraugus, Allegany, Steuben, Chemung, Tioga, Broome, Delaware, Sullivan, Orange, and Rockland), passes through the cities of Salamanca, Olean, Corning, Elmira, and Binghamton, and enters the vicinity of several others, including Jamestown and Middletown. As it proceeds across the state, it intersects many of New York's Interstate and U.S. Highways, including U.S. Route 219 (US 219) in Salamanca, I-99 and US 15 near Corning, I-81 in Binghamton, and I-84 near Middletown. The portion of NY 17 in the vicinity of Waverly is actually located in Pennsylvania; however, it is maintained by the New York State Department of Transportation (NYSDOT).

The route was assigned in 1924, extending from Westfield to Suffern via at-grade highways. It was moved onto the Quickway and the Southern Tier Expressway as sections of both were completed from the 1950s to the 1980s. Two of NY 17's suffixed routes, NY 17C and NY 17M, follow substantial portions of NY 17's pre-freeway alignment. In 1998, all of NY 17 between the Pennsylvania state line and Harriman was designated as "Future I-86". The westernmost  of the route was designated as I-86 one year later, and the designation has been gradually extended eastward as sections of NY 17 were improved to Interstate Highway standards. Prior to the I-86 designation, NY 17 was part of a 3-state Route 17 along with New Jersey Route 17 and the former Pennsylvania Route 17 (PA 17).

Route description

Pennsylvania to Elmira

NY 17 begins at the point where I-86 crosses the New York–Pennsylvania border in Mina, Chautauqua County. I-86 heads westward from there to its western terminus at I-90. I-86 and NY 17 continue eastward through the Southern Tier, encountering NY 426 (exit 4) a short distance from the state line prior to meeting NY 76 (exit 6) south of Sherman. East of exit 8 (NY 394), I-86 and NY 17 cross Chautauqua Lake and follow the lake shore eastward to Jamestown, where it connects to NY 60 at exit 12 due north of the city. East of the city, the expressway meets US 62 at exit 14 and is joined by the old Erie Railroad line, which parallels the expressway as it heads across southern New York.

Between exits 17 and 18 (NY 280), I-86 and NY 17 cross the Allegheny Reservoir near its northernmost extent. Past NY 280, the freeway runs adjacent to the northern extent of the Allegany State Park and follows the reservoir and the connecting Allegheny River eastward to Salamanca. Near downtown Salamanca, I-86 and NY 17 meet US 219 (exit 21). US 219 joins the expressway east to exit 23 near Carrollton, where it splits from I-86 and NY 17 and heads toward Bradford, Pennsylvania, forming the eastern edge of the state park as it heads south. Meanwhile, the expressway continues east to Olean, where it meets NY 417 (a previous alignment of NY 17) at exit 24 west of town and NY 16 (exit 27) north of the area.

Past Olean, the route drifts northward away from Pennsylvania toward Hornell, where I-86 and NY 17 intersect NY 36 (exit 34). To the east in Avoca, the Southern Tier Expressway meets I-390 at exit 36. I-86 and NY 17 southeast from the junction, passing through Bath on its way an interchange with I-99 and US 15 in Painted Post (exit 44). Here, I-99 and US 15 begin and head south toward Pennsylvania, while I-86 and NY 17 continue east through Corning to the city of Elmira.

Elmira to Harriman

From Elmira to Binghamton, NY 17, the Erie Railroad (now operated by Norfolk Southern as the Southern Tier Line), and its old alignments generally stay close together. They follow the Chemung River to exit 60 (US 220 in South Waverly, Pennsylvania) and the Susquehanna River from east of exit 61 (Waverly, New York) to Binghamton; on the latter section, both NY 17C and NY 434 are old NY 17. Between the two rivers, which intersect in Pennsylvania, the general corridor runs just north of the state line in New York. However, NY 17 itself crosses into Pennsylvania for approximately 1 mile (1.6 km) between a point west of exit 60 and a point west of exit 61; additionally, all the ramps at exit 60 and portions of the eastbound ramps at exits 59A and 61 are in Pennsylvania. Despite being in Pennsylvania, it is still signed as NY-17, and these roadways are still maintained by the New York State Department of Transportation. At the Tioga County line near Waverly, I-86 temporarily terminates as NY 17 continues eastward toward Binghamton.

Near downtown Binghamton, NY 17 goes around the side of Prospect Mountain at what is locally known as "Kamikaze Curve". Heading eastbound, the freeway curves sharply left around the hillside, splits into ramps to I-81 north and south, and curves right to merge into I-81 south as it passes over the Chenango River. From that point east and southeast about 5 miles (8 km), I-81 and NY 17 run concurrently. NY 17 splits from I-81, the Erie Railroad and the Susquehanna River to the east into Stilson Hollow; from this split (exit 75) to its end, most of NY 17 does not follow the Erie Railroad, which crosses into Pennsylvania several times.

At the end of Stilson Hollow, NY 17 heads over a summit and into the valley formed by the Occanum Creek. The creek empties into the Susquehanna River at Windsor (exit 79), which NY 17 follows southeast to Damascus (exit 80) before turning northeast along Tuscarora Creek. It soon turns east and southeast over a summit, rejoining the Erie Railroad just north of Gulf Summit. The highway and railroad head east along Oquaga Creek to Deposit (exit 84), where they turn southeast along the West Branch Delaware River. A gap in the freeway stretches from here to just short of Hancock (exit 87), the place the West Branch joins with the East Branch Delaware River. The Erie Railroad continues southeast along the combined Delaware River, while NY 17 turns east along the valley formed by the East Branch, either closely following or built directly over the abandoned New York, Ontario and Western Railway to Liberty.

At East Branch (exit 90), the East Branch Delaware River turns north, and NY 17 continues east with the Beaver Kill to Roscoe (exit 94), Willowemoc Creek to Livingston Manor (exit 96), and Little Beaver Kill to Parksville (exit 98). The highway and parallel NYO&W pass south over a summit to Liberty (exits 99–100), and continue along the Middle Mongaup River to Ferndale (exit 101). The NYO&W turned east there, but NY 17 continues south over a summit and into the Spring Brook and East Mongaup River valleys past Harris (exit 102). NY 17 then cuts southeast cross-country to Monticello (exit 104; passing Monticello Raceway) and beyond, following the old Newburgh and Cochecton Turnpike (old NY 17) to Bloomingburg (exit 116). The old Middletown and Wurtsboro Turnpike, also old NY 17, and partially NY 17M, runs south to Middletown, which NY 17 cuts cross-country to bypass to the east, rejoining NY 17M – and the main line of the Erie Railroad – at Goshen (exit 123). NY 17, its old former alignment (NY 17M) and the Erie run generally east-southeast, partly cross-country and partly through small stream valleys, to the end of the freeway, the directional change in NY 17 from east–west to north–south, and the junction of the Erie with its branch to Newburgh.

Harriman to New Jersey

NY 17 heads southwest from the Quickway as an at-grade roadway, passing through the village of Woodbury before entering the village of Harriman, where it intersects with the eastern terminus of NY 17M. As the route heads southward from this junction, its signage changes from being east or west to north or south. The route parallels the Thruway as it proceeds through a disjointed piece of Harriman State Park and enters the town of Tuxedo. While inside the park, NY 17 intersects Arden Valley Road, a highway that connects to Seven Lakes Drive deep inside the park. South of Arden Valley Road, NY 17 briefly exits Harriman State Park and enters the hamlet of Southfields, where it intersects with County Route 19 (CR 19) and passes by the Red Apple Rest, a former restaurant and roadside attraction.

Past the hamlet, the route heads back into the park and intersects with NY 17A and CR 106 near the park's western boundary. South of the junction, NY 17 leaves the Park and proceeds through a lightly populated area to the Village of Tuxedo Park. At the Tuxedo Park train station is access to some hiking trails in Harriman State Park. The route continues on, paralleling the Thruway into Rockland County. On the other side of the county line, NY 17 enters the village of Sloatsburg, where it meets Seven Lakes Drive and connects to CR 72 by way of a modified trumpet interchange.

Outside of Sloatsburg, NY 17 winds its way southeasterly along the Ramapo River and the Thruway through the town of Ramapo to the hamlet of the same name, based just north of NY 17's junction with NY 59. Here, NY 17 turns to the southwest, meeting the Thruway at exit 15A before traversing a sparsely developed area of the village of Hillburn. At Suffern Road, NY 17 becomes southbound only as it merges onto I-287 and proceeds to the New Jersey state line, where it connects to New Jersey's Route 17.

History

Origins

Before the automobile 

From Binghamton to Corning, NY 17 follows the course of the Great Bend and Bath Turnpike, which was legislated in 1808 to continue the Cochecton and Great Bend Turnpike (US 11) through the Susquehanna Valley. The road ran from the Pennsylvania state line at Great Bend through Binghamton, Owego, and Elmira to Bath. In its day, it was a major route of travel through the Susquehanna Valley. Today, the road is designated US 11 from Pennsylvania to Binghamton, then NY 17C to Waverly, NY 352 into Corning, and NY 415 to Bath. The at-grade sections of NY 17 in Orange County follow the Orange Turnpike south of Southfields and the New Windsor and Cornwall Turnpike to its north.

Liberty Highway and Legislative Route 4 
The original routing of NY 17, from Westfield to Harriman, was largely designated in 1908 by the New York State Legislature as Route 4, an unsigned legislative route. This routing was incorporated in 1918 as the main portion of an auto trail called the Liberty Highway, which connected New York City to Cleveland via Hackensack, Liberty, the Southern Tier, and Erie.

Legislative Route 4 began at legislative Route 18 (current US 20) in Westfield and proceeded southeast through Mayville to Jamestown on what is now NY 394 and NY 430. From there, the route headed generally eastward to Salamanca over modern NY 394, NY 242, and NY 353, and southeast to Olean via NY 417. At Olean, the route shifted northward, passing through Hinsdale, Friendship, and Belvidere on current NY 16, NY 446 and Allegany County's CR 20 before returning southward on what is now NY 19 to access the village of Wellsville.

From Wellsville to Andover and from Jasper to Corning, Route 4 followed modern NY 417. In between Andover and Jasper, however, Route 4 veered north on current NY 21 and NY 36 to serve Hornell. East of Corning, the alignment of legislative Route 4 ran along the Great Bend and Bath Turnpike, and more closely resembled the modern alignments of the Southern Tier Expressway and the Quickway. Route 4 exited Corning on what is now NY 352 and followed it to Big Flats, where it broke from NY 352 and proceeded to Horseheads on Chemung CR 64 and to Elmira on what is now Lake Road, Madison Avenue and the east end of NY 352. Between Elmira and Binghamton, Route 4 followed either local roads that were bypassed or upgraded into the Southern Tier Expressway, namely modern NY 17 and Chemung and Tioga CR 60 from Elmira to Waverly, NY 17C between Waverly and Owego, NY 434 from Owego to Vestal, and NY 17C and Riverside Drive (via NY 26) from Vestal to Binghamton.

Route 4 exited the city on US 11 and followed it to Kirkwood Center, a hamlet adjacent to the eastern junction of NY 17 and I-81. From this point to Harriman, except for one section near Middletown, the path Route 4 followed became the basis for the Quickway several decades later. Between Kirkwood Center and Hancock, Route 4 utilized what was later upgraded into the Quickway (via Broome CR 28 from Windsor to Deposit). East of here, it used parallel roads instead: modern "Old Route 17" (Delaware CR 17 and Sullivan CRs 179A to 174) from Deposit to Monticello, Sullivan CRs 173 to 171 between Monticello and Bloomingburg, and Orange CR 76 and NY 17M from Bloomingburg to Harriman. At Harriman, Route 4 broke from the Liberty Highway and proceeded northeast over current US 6 and NY 293 to Highland Falls, where it ended at legislative Route 3 (modern US 9W). The portion of the Liberty Highway between Suffern and Harriman became part of legislative Route 39-b in 1911; however, this designation was removed on March 1, 1921. Another auto trail, the West Shore Route, also followed this section of the Liberty Highway, but proceeded north from Harimman along modern-day NY 32.

Designation and early changes

When New York first signed its state highways with route numbers in 1924, much of legislative Route 4 was designated as NY 17. From Randolph to Salamanca, NY 17 followed the more southerly routing of the Liberty Highway instead of the Route 4 routing, bypassing Little Valley to the south in favor of a direct connection between Randolph and Salamanca (current NY 394 and NY 951T). In Vestal, NY 17 was routed along the south bank of the Susquehanna River, bypassing Endicott and Johnson City on what is now NY 434 and Broome CR 44. Lastly, NY 17 broke from the path of legislative Route 4 in Harriman and followed the former Route 39-b south to the New Jersey state line at Suffern. In the 1930 renumbering of state highways in New York, NY 17 basically remained intact. The only changes made at this time were the straightening out of the Olean–Wellsville segment (now via Ceres) and the Andover–Jasper segment (now via Greenwood).

NY 17 initially reached New Jersey by way of Suffern's Orange Avenue (now US 202) and connected to New Jersey's Route 2 at the state line. By 1932, an alternate route of NY 17 between the New Jersey state line at Hillburn and the hamlet of Ramapo on the western bank of the Ramapo River was designated as NY 339. The route largely followed the path of modern I-287 and the New York State Thruway between the two locations. It initially became a local road upon crossing into New Jersey; however, Route 2 was realigned  to connect to NY 339 instead of NY 17. In the mid-1930s, the alignments of NY 17 and NY 339 south of Ramapo were flipped, placing NY 17 on the western route. By 1938, NY 17 was relocated onto a new highway through the Hillburn village limits. While the southern half of the new road utilized the old highway, the northern half veered to the west of both Hillburn and old NY 17, bypassing the village before rejoining the old road south of Ramapo.

Conversion to expressway

The explosive growth of the tourism industry in the Catskill Mountains region, which began in the 1930s and intensified after World War II, stretched the rural road to its limits. Scores of hotels, resorts and bungalow colonies attracted hundreds of thousands of vacationing New Yorkers, whose cars left the two-lane NY 17 hopelessly jammed in summer. Many towns, especially the fairly large city of Middletown, were paralyzed on Friday evenings and Sunday afternoons in the summertime, as traffic passed through local downtowns and their traffic lights. In addition, the tight turns and steep inclines along the route led to numerous fatal crashes, including two milk tanker truck crashes in the mid-1950s. In response, New York State officials planned a four-lane replacement, the first free long-distance expressway in the state and one of the earliest in the United States.

The first segment of the new highway extended from Fair Oaks to Goshen, bypassing the city of Middletown to the northeast. It opened to traffic in July 1951 as a realignment of NY 17. As more sections of the freeway—known as the Quickway—opened up during the 1950s and 1960s, NY 17 was moved onto them. The Quickway was completed by 1968, connecting Binghamton to Harriman by way of a continuous, mostly limited-access highway. Farther west, plans were also in the works to build an expressway across the Southern Tier. The highway was first proposed by New York Governor Thomas Dewey in 1953, and the first sections of the Southern Tier Expressway were completed in the mid-1960s. At the time, NY 17 followed the entirety of two of the four open sections (Steamburg to Salamanca and Owego to the Broome County line) and part of a third (Corning to Lowman via Elmira).

As more continuous pieces of the expressway opened during the 1970s, NY 17 was realigned onto them, with much of NY 17's old alignment becoming NY 394, NY 417, or NY 17C. By 1980, the expressway was complete from Bemus Point to Binghamton except for two areas near Salamanca and Corning. Although NY 17 continued to extend northwestward along its original alignment from Bemus Point to Westfield, both highways were also designated as parts of NY 430 and NY 394 in anticipation of the completion of the Southern Tier Expressway west of Chautauqua Lake, which NY 17 would be rerouted to follow. This segment was built in stages during the 1980s as a super two highway; it was widened to four lanes in 1997. The portions of the freeway in and around Salamanca and Corning were completed in the late 1980s and mid-1990s, completing the conversion of NY 17 into a continuous, mostly limited-access highway from the Pennsylvania state line to Harriman.

On December 3, 1999, the westernmost  of NY 17 were designated as part of I-86, a new route that had been written into law a year earlier. As legislated, I-86 will eventually extend eastward along the length of both the Southern Tier Expressway and the Quickway to the New York State Thruway in Harriman once both highways are brought up to Interstate Highway standards. I-86 was extended east to Horseheads in 2004 and Elmira in 2008; additionally, a  stretch of NY 17 in central Broome County was designated as I-86 in 2006. In September 2013, the Federal Highway Administration (FHWA) approved a  extension of the I-86 designation from exit 56 in Elmira to the Tioga county line. The remainder of NY 17 west of I-87 will be designated as I-86 after the remaining at-grade sections are eliminated and the highway is brought up to Interstate Highway standards.

Other developments 
The New York State Thruway Authority converted the Harriman Toll Barrier at the interchange of NY 17 and I-87 (exit 16 on I-87) to cashless tolling. This included the creation of a solar photovoltaic energy generating facility (solar park) to help power the toll and maintenance facilities in Harriman, Woodbury, Spring Valley, and Nyack. Cashless tolling began on the night of September 27, 2018. This was a part of Governor Andrew Cuomo's goal to convert the entirety of the New York Thruway to cashless tolling.

On August 9, 2019, Governor Andrew Cuomo signed into law that a portion of NY 17 was to be designated the "Dennis ‘Matt’ Howe Memorial Highway" from exit 63 in the hamlet of Lounsberry to exit 62 in the village of Nichols. On March 18, 2019, Howe passed away from injuries sustained when a tractor-trailer collided with his DOT truck as he and others were performing highway safety work on NY 17. The signs were unveiled and the dedication ceremony was held on October 29, 2019.

In November 2019, NYSDOT completed the reconstruction of exit 131 along NY 17. As part of the project, a diverging diamond interchange was built at the exit to improve access between NY 17 and NY 32. Also as part of the project, NY 32 was widened to three lanes to each way; CR 64 / Nininger Road was extended to Woodbury Common Premium Outlets; and exit ramps were built from NY 32 north and NY 32 south to meet Nininger Road at two respective traffic circles. In addition, a new park-and-ride was built, and the ramp from NY 17 west to Woodbury Common was demolished.

In December 2020, NYSDOT completed construction of a new exit 125, which was built to accommodate the new Legoland New York. NY 17 was expanded to three lanes in each direction between exits 124 and 125. Harriman Drive was expanded to two lanes in each direction between the exit and Legoland's entrance.

Future

Widening in Orange and Sullivan counties 
NYSDOT has requested proposals for plans to widen NY 17 between the Thruway in Orange County and the town of Liberty in Sullivan County. The widening is supported by the 17-Forward-86 coalition, several state senators, and various businesses and organizations in the area.

Major intersections

Suffixed routes

NY 17 has had 13 suffixed routes bearing 11 different designations. Five are still assigned to their routes, while eight have been removed or renumbered. A fourteenth, NY 17L, was proposed in 1939 as part of current NY 97, but canceled.

The NY 17A designation has been used for two distinct highways:
The first NY 17A was an alternate route of NY 17 between Randolph and Salamanca via Little Valley. It was assigned in the mid-1920s and renumbered to NY 17H in the 1930 renumbering of state highways in New York.
The current NY 17A is an alternate route of NY 17 between Goshen and Southfields that connects NY 17 to Warwick in Orange County. It was assigned as part of the 1930 renumbering.
NY 17B is a spur of NY 17 connecting Monticello to NY 97 in Callicoon. When it was originally assigned in 1930, it also extended northward to Hancock via modern NY 97.
NY 17C is an alternate route of NY 17 between Waverly and Binghamton in Tioga and Broome counties. The western terminus of the route was initially located in Owego upon being assigned in 1930.
NY 17D was a spur of NY 17 in the vicinity of Elmira, Chemung County that ran from downtown Elmira to the Pennsylvania border east of Wellsburg. The route, assigned in 1930, was renumbered to NY 427 in the early 1940s.
NY 17E was an alternate route of NY 17 between Big Flats and Elmira in Chemung County. The route, assigned in 1930, was renumbered to NY 352 in October 1966 after local community pressure.
NY 17F was an alternate route of NY 17 between Andover, Allegany County, and Addison, Steuben County. The route, assigned in 1930, was a northerly alternate route of NY 17 that served Hornell and Canisteo. NY 17F was removed in the early 1940s and is now NY 21, NY 36 and Steuben County's CR 119.
NY 17G was a spur assigned in 1930 to what is now NY 248 south of NY 417. It became part of an extended NY 248 in the early 1940s.
The NY 17H designation has been used for two distinct highways:
The first NY 17H was an alternate route of NY 17 between Randolph and Salamanca via Little Valley in Cattaraugus County. It was assigned in 1930 and removed . The route became part of an extended NY 242 west of Little Valley and remained part of NY 18 (which NY 17H overlapped) east of the village (that portion of NY 18 became NY 353 in 1962).
The second NY 17H was a spur route of NY 17 in the vicinity of Binghamton. The route began at NY 17 in Binghamton and followed Riverside Drive west and north to Johnson City, where it ended at NY 17C. It was assigned by 1940 and partially replaced with NY 201 in September 1971.
NY 17J was a westerly alternate route of NY 17 between Mayville and Jamestown along the western edge of Chautauqua Lake. It was assigned in 1930 and supplanted by NY 394 in November 1973.
NY 17K is a spur linking NY 17 in Bloomingburg to US 9W and NY 32 in Newburgh, Orange County. It was assigned .
NY 17M is the former routing of NY 17 in Orange County. The route begins north of Middletown in Fair Oaks and rejoins NY 17 in Harriman. It was assigned in 1951.

See also

New York State Bicycle Route 17

Former alignments
New York State Route 352
New York State Route 394
New York State Route 417
New York State Route 430
New York State Route 434
New York State Route 951T
The entire 170 series of county routes in Sullivan County except 174A

County route systems containing a former alignment
List of county routes in Chemung County, New York
List of county routes in Delaware County, New York
List of county routes in Orange County, New York
List of county routes in Tioga County, New York

References

External links

Original configuration for I-87/I-287/NY 17 interchange in Suffern (Empire State Roads)

017
Transportation in Orange County, New York
Transportation in Rockland County, New York
Interstate 86 (Pennsylvania–New York)
Binghamton, New York
Limited-access roads in New York (state)
Transportation in Allegany County, New York
Transportation in Broome County, New York
Transportation in Cattaraugus County, New York
Transportation in Chautauqua County, New York
Transportation in Chemung County, New York
Transportation in Delaware County, New York
Transportation in Steuben County, New York
Transportation in Sullivan County, New York
Transportation in Tioga County, New York